"Sigueme y Te Sigo" is a song by Puerto Rican artist Daddy Yankee. It is the second single from his upcoming studio album El Disco Duro, originally scheduled to be released during early 2017. It was written by Daddy Yankee, Luis "Wichi" Ortíz and Chris Jeday (who is also the producer). The song received two Latin Grammy Awards nominations and won a Latin American Music Award for Favorite Urban Song in 2015.

Music video 
The official music video was released on May 11 through his Vevo channel. The theme of the video features a live singer at a school dance, with the king and queen to be chosen according to how many followers they have in social networks, hence the title of the song, although the lyrics are not centred in social networks. The music video has reached 633 million views.

Charts and certifications

Weekly charts

Year-end charts

Sales and certifications

Accolades

See also
List of Billboard number-one Latin songs of 2015

References

2015 songs
2015 singles
Daddy Yankee songs
Songs written by Daddy Yankee
Universal Music Latino singles
Songs written by Chris Jedi
Music videos directed by Jessy Terrero